Moderata Fonte, directly translates to Modest Well is a pseudonym of Modesta di Pozzo di Forzi (or Zorzi), also known as Modesto Pozzo (or Modesta, feminization of Modesto),  (1555–1592) was a Venetian writer and poet.  Besides the posthumously-published dialogues, Giustizia delle donne and Il merito delle donne (gathered in The Worth of Women, 1600), for which she is best known, she wrote a romance and religious poetry. Details of her life are known from the biography by Giovanni Niccolò Doglioni (1548-1629), her uncle, included as a preface to the dialogue.

Life and History

Pozzo's parents, Girolamo da Pozzo and Marietta da Pozzo (née dal Moro), died of the plague in 1556, when she was just a year old, and she and her older brother Leonardo were placed in the care of their maternal grandmother and her second husband.  She spent several years in the convent of Santa Marta where, thanks to her extraordinary memory, she was often displayed as a child prodigy.  She was able to repeat long sermons she had heard or read only once. At the age of nine she was returned to her grandmother's family where she learned Latin and composition from her grandfather, Prospero Saraceni, a man of letters, as well as from her brother, Leonardo. Her brother also taught her to read and write in Latin, draw, sing, and play the lute and harpsichord. She, in addition, had informally continued her education under the guidance of Saraceni by allowing her the run of his library.  From 1576,  in her early twenties, she would continue to have a relationship with the Saracenis as she went to go stay with the their daughter, Saracena.

On 15 February 1582, at twenty-seven years old, Moderata wed Filippo de’ Zorzi who was a lawyer and government official, with whom she would later have four children. They had two sons, Pietro who was the oldest and Girolamo, the third born. They  also had two daughters, the second born Cecilia and the youngest whose name was never released.   Their marriage seemed to reflect equality and mutual respect as evidenced by de’ Zorzi returning her dowry a year and a half after their wedding. An official document dated October 1583 states that de’ Zorzi returns the dowry "thanks to his pure kindness and to the great love and good will that he has felt and feels for" her. Likewise, Moderata Fonte describes her husband in one of her writings as a man of "virtue, goodness and integrity".

These actions were significant in this time period, since women did not typically have property under their own name with which they could govern. Furthermore, the appeal for women to own property has been a longstanding debate in feminist advocacy.

Works
One of Fonte's first known works is a musical play performed before the Doge Da Ponte in 1581 at the festival of St. Stephen's Day.  Le Feste [The Feasts] includes about 350 verses with several singing parts.  Also in 1581, she published her epic poem I tredici canti del Floridoro [The Thirteen Cantos of Floridoro] dedicated to Bianca Cappello and her new husband, Francesco I de' Medici, the Grand Duke of Tuscany.  This poem is perhaps the second chivalric work published by an Italian woman, after Tullia d’Aragona's Il Meschino, which appeared in 1560.

Moderata Fonte wrote two long religious poems, La Passione di Cristo [Christ's Passion] and La Resurrezione di Gesù Cristo nostro Signore che segue alla Santissima Passione in otava rima da Moderata Fonte [The Resurrection of Jesus Christ, our Lord, which follows the Holy Passion in octaves by Moderata Fonte].  In these works she describes in detail the emotional reactions of the Virgin Mary and Mary Magdalen to Christ's death and resurrection, illustrating her deep belief in the active participation of women in the events of the Passion and Resurrection of Christ.

She is perhaps best known for a composition that she worked on from the years 1588 to 1592 called Il Merito delle donne [On The Merit of Women], published posthumously in 1600, in which she criticizes the treatment of women by men while celebrating women's virtues and intelligence and arguing that women are superior to men, but does not go as far as to appeal for sexual equality. Perhaps a forerunner of consciousness raising that attempted to bring awareness to the role of men in the women question or the quelles des femmes The woman question.

When she died in 1592 at the age of thirty-seven, Pozzo had four children according to her biographer and mentor, Giovanni Nicolo Doglioni: the oldest aged ten years, the second aged eight, the third aged six and the newborn, whose birth caused her death. Her husband placed a marble epitaph on her tomb which describes Pozzo as ‘femina doctissima’ [a very learned woman].

The Worth of Women: Wherein is Clearly Revealed Their Nobility and Their Superiority to Men By Moderata Fonte (1997) translated by Virginia Cox. .
 Moderata Fonte (Modesta Pozzo). Floridoro: A Chivalric Romance. Ed. by Valeria Finucci. Tr. by Julia Kisacky. Chicago: University of Chicago Press, 2006. Pp xxx, 493 (The Other Voice in Early Modern Europe). .

Giustizia delle donne (The Worth of Women: Wherein is Clearly Revealed Their Nobility and Their Superiority to Men) 
Giustizia delle donne was published after Fonte's death along with Il merito delle donne. Both literary works are influenced by Boccaccio's Decameron: they are frame stories where the characters develop their dialogues and exempla.

A group of women are talking in a venetian garden when Pasquale arrives and breaks the relaxed atmosphere by referring the last argument she has had with her husband. It leads to an inspiring conversation about "masculine behaviour" in which they complain about the unfair situations they have to face every day; they imagine twelve punishments (one per month) in order to raise awareness among men. That way, they'd have to suffer from public humiliation, they'd have to be self-sacrificing parents and be isolated from their friends and family. The most remarkable punishment is the one dedicated to silence: only women have a voice, a voice which finally lets them speak and organize society.

The most significant literary devices in this work are irony, paradoxes and references to the reader (as it happened in ancient novels). She was influenced by Plato dialogues’ rhythm and through all these procedures achieves to build up a precise portrait of the social concerns in the 16th Century.

The book is divided in 14 chapters: the first one works as an introduction or frame, the next twelve cover punishments and attacks to the masculine figure and in the last one they return to real life after their imaginary trip, but, as it happens in all trips, they come back wiser and filled with hope.

Themes and Outcomes

Impact and Contemporaries 
Writing takes up arms in the disputes of the worth of women, however, the freedom of speech of the women characters of the renaissance often occur in the absence of men. Literary dialogue often silenced or excluded women, however, Moderata Fonte breaks this tradition in creating the Worth of Women by the complete absence of men. In this dialogue the worth of women is not questioned, but rather the worth of men is put on trial in their garden debate. The second part of Fonte's work demonstrates what it means to become a renaissance woman through intellectual understanding and feminized friendship. The importance on female communities is and exhortation for women to realize their dignity and become politically autonomous individuals. This is reflective of Laura Cereta's idea of the 'Republic of Women'. The women never come to a conclusion, there is no point that is made, but rather the space to speak freely is temporary and borrowed. The women in the end have to leave the garden to return home. The garden setting displays the potential feminised society as all of Fonte's characters express the moral capacity of women and their deserving of material means to be autonomous, though from different arguments.

Moderata was a transgressive and early modern author, that influenced modern thinking and understanding of feminism in historical context. Her manuscript was published after her death, as she finished completing her writings on the day before she died giving birth to her fourth child. The themes of Moderata Fonte's works are literary spaces of reevaluation. One of the larger themes are love, freedom of speech and the worth of women. Some authors have suggested that Moderata Fonte's last work, along with other contemporaries like Lucrezia Marinella, were meant to be a critic against Giuseppe Passi's, I donneschi difetti [Women's Defects].

Legacy and influence 
Before the publications made by Moderata Fonte and Lucrezia Marinella, the only ones who had publications for Italian defenses were men, so they were seen as proper women and left a legacy of for others like Isabella and Francesco Andreini who used informed vernacular compositions to shape self-representation revitalizing the quelles des femmes. The subtle feminist perspective that is at stake in these literary works is the role of property in the devaluation of women. More recently women have been achieving political freedom as a result of the shift towards women managing their property.

However, in the 20th century a group of intellectual women rescued her texts and transmitted her legacy: Eleonora Carinci, Adriana Chemello, Virginia Cox. Virginia Cox and Valeria Finucci make the argument of gendered differences being nurtured in their analysis of Fonte rather than inherent in female biology. Patricia Labalme and Virginia Cox develop the early feminist critique of misogyny in the writings of Venetian women. Diana Robin exposes the role of women in intellectual life and the historical importance of women writers. She exposes the integrated role of men, women and their relationships in this movement of recognizing the woman as an intellectual.Fonte became very cited in other works of commentary on women including Pietro Paolo di Ribera and Cristofano Bronzini. More recently, English and American theoreticians took inspiration from her ideas and formulated some concepts (man's punishment, mansplaining) that are vital in current feminism.

Further reading
 
 Rinaldina Russell (editor) (1994), Italian Women Writers: A Bio-bibliographical Sourcebook, pp. 128–137 by Paola Malpezzi Price

References

External links
 Querelle | Moderata Fonte Querelle.ca is a website devoted to the works of authors contributing to the pro-woman side of the querelle des femmes.
:it:s:Autore:Modesta Pozzo
Project Continua: Biography of Modesto Pozzo -pseudonym Moderata Fonte Project Continua is a web-based multimedia resource dedicated to the creation and preservation of women's intellectual history from the earliest surviving evidence into the 21st century.

Italian women poets
Italian Renaissance writers
1555 births
1592 deaths
Republic of Venice poets
16th-century Venetian women
Republic of Venice women writers
16th-century Italian women writers
Italian feminists
Women writers (Renaissance)